Reckless is the second album by The SteelDrivers, released on September 7, 2010 by Rounder Records.

Critical reception

AllMusic's review states that "The Steeldrivers may play traditional bluegrass, but they do it with a style that's informed by outlaw country and rock & roll attitude."

Jonathan Keefe of Slant Magazine writes, "What the SteelDrivers did so well on their self-titled debut, and what they build on throughout Reckless, is incorporate a heavy dollop of traditional blues and Southern soul into their brand of bluegrass."

American Songwriter writes that "it’s nice to know that Nashville is capable of putting out something besides more bad pop. Produced by Luke Wooten, whose production on Leslie Satcher’s Love Letters was the high point of Nashville music in 2000. Highly recommended, especially since you probably won’t hear this band in this incarnation again."

John Lupton of Country Standard Time begins his review with, "Following the release of their self-titled debut two years ago, the Nashville-based SteelDrivers quickly developed a following for their distinctive blend of bluegrass and blues with a dash of Southern rock"

Track listing

Musicians
Richard Bailey – banjo
Mike Fleming – bass, vocals
Tammy Rogers – fiddle, viola, vocals
Chris Stapleton – guitar, vocals
Mike Henderson – mandolin, resonator guitar, harmonica

Production
Photography by Mickey Dobo
Producer – Luke Wooten, The SteelDrivers
Assistant Production Manager – Donna Winklmann
Recorded by Luke Wooten at Ocean Way, Nashville, Tennessee
Mixed and mastered by Luke Wooten at West/Wing/Station West
Lacquer Cut by Anne-Marie Suenram, George Horn at Fantasy Studios
Cover – Scott Billington
Design – Rachel E. Sullivan
Assistant Engineer – P.J. French
Track information and credits verified from the album's liner notes.

References

External links
The SteelDrivers Official Site
Rounder Records Official Site

2010 albums
Rounder Records albums
The SteelDrivers albums